Events during the year 1994 in Italy.

Incumbents
President: Oscar Luigi Scalfaro 
Prime Minister: 
Carlo Azeglio Ciampi (until 10 May)
Silvio Berlusconi (from 10 May)

Events  
27 March – The 1994 Italian general election is won by Silvio Berlusconi
8 to 10 July – The 20th G7 summit was held in Naples.
17 July – Brazil wins the FIFA World Cup by defeating Italy, 3–2, following a penalty shootout in the final game at the Rose Bowl in Pasadena, California, USA.
11 September – The 1994 Italian Grand Prix, originally scheduled for 12 August, is held at Monza and won by Damon Hill.

Births  

2 January – Adam Masina, footballer
16 February – Federico Bernardeschi, footballer
22 February – Tedua (Mario Molinari), rapper
7 April – Roberto Gagliardini, footballer
16 April – Joshua Di Silvio, electronic musician and DJ
5 May – Mattia Caldara, footballer
7 May – Graziano Di Prima, dancer and choreographer
11 May – Roberto Insigne, footballer
29 July – Daniele Rugani, footballer
4 November – Davide Leto, footballer
23 December – Michele Bravi, singer

Deaths  

23 March – Giulietta Masina, actress (b. 1921).
21 May – Giovanni Goria, politician, prime minister (b. 1943)
4 June – Massimo Troisi, actor, screenwriter, and film director (b. 1953)
4 August – Giovanni Spadolini, Prime Minister (b. 1925)
6 August – Domenico Modugno, singer-songwriter, actor and politician (b. 1928).
6 September – Duccio Tessari, director and screenwriter (b. 1926).
18 September – Franco Moschino, fashion designer (b. 1950).
6 December – Gian Maria Volonté, actor (b. 1933)
24 December – Rossano Brazzi actor (b. 1916).
26 December Sylva Koscina, actress (b. 1933).

References 

 
1990s in Italy
Years of the 21st century in Italy
Italy
Italy